Lt Gen (R) Bilal Akbar is a retired General of the Pakistan Army and retired Pakistan Ambassador to Saudi Arabia.

Biography
General Bilal was admitted at the Pakistan Military Academy in 1984, and passed out from the academy with a class of 73rd PMA Long Course on 13 March 1986. He gained commission in the army as 2nd-Lt in the Artillery Corps. He is a graduate of the Command and Staff College in Quetta, the National Defense University in Islamabad, and the Turkish Staff College in Istanbul.

In 2013–14, Major-General Bilal served as the GOC of the 11th Division stationed in Lahore.

In August 2014, Major General Bilal Akbar took charge as the Director-General of the Sindh Rangers. On 11 December 2016, Maj-Gen. Akbar was promoted to the three-star rank and appointed as the Chief of General Staff at the Army GHQ in Rawalpindi. On 24 August 2018, Lt Gen Bilal Akbar was then posted as the field commander of the X Corps stationed in Rawalpindi as a result of a major command reshuffle.

On 28 December 2018, Lt Gen Bilal Akbar was appointed as Colonel commandant of the Mujahid Force Regiment stationed in Bhimber. On 12 September 2019, Lt Gen Akbar was appointed as Chairman Pakistan Ordnance Factory.

In January 2021, Akbar was appointed Pakistan's ambassador to Saudi Arabia after his retirement from the Army in December 2020.

References

Punjabi people
Pakistan Military Academy alumni
National Defence University, Pakistan alumni
Pakistani expatriates in Turkey
Pakistani generals
People of the insurgency in Khyber Pakhtunkhwa
Ambassadors of Pakistan to Saudi Arabia